You is a thriller novel by Caroline Kepnes, published in September 2014.
The novel has been translated into 19 languages, and was adapted into a television series of the same name.

Kepnes published sequels, Hidden Bodies, in 2016 and You Love Me in 2021.

Synopsis 
Guinevere Beck, an aspiring writer, is employed as a teaching assistant while simultaneously working on her thesis. When she strides into the East Village bookstore where Joe Goldberg works, he is instantly smitten with her. Beck is everything that Joe thinks he has ever wanted: gorgeous, tough, razor-smart, and as sexy as his wildest dreams. But there is more to Goldberg than Beck realizes, and much more to Beck than her oh-so-perfect facade.  Their mutual obsession quickly spirals into a whirlwind of deadly consequences.

Reception 
Jennifer Selway of the Daily Express described the suspense of the narrative:
"What you don’t know, and this clever, chilling, teasing tale keeps you hanging on by your fingertips, is exactly what sort of bad ending is coming up." Emma Oulton from Bustle praised the novel, stating that it "is one of the most unsettling books I’ve read this year, but despite being thoroughly creeped out, I couldn’t put it down even for a second."

TV adaptation 

In February 2015, it was announced that Greg Berlanti and Sera Gamble would develop a television series based on the novel at Showtime. Two years later, it was announced that the series was purchased by Lifetime and put on fast-track development. You premiered on September 9, 2018.

References 

2014 American novels
American novels adapted into television shows
American satirical novels
American thriller novels
Novels by Caroline Kepnes
Novels set in New York City
Atria Publishing Group books